The South Fork Bridge is a historic bridge spanning the South Fork Ouachita River in Fountain Lake, Arkansas. It formerly carried Arkansas Highway 128, whose modern bridge now stands just to the south, a short way east of its junction with Arkansas Highway 5. It was built in 1928 by a county crew, after major flooding in 1927 damaged road infrastructure in the area.

The bridge was listed on the National Register of Historic Places in 1990.

See also
List of bridges documented by the Historic American Engineering Record in Arkansas
List of bridges on the National Register of Historic Places in Arkansas
National Register of Historic Places listings in Garland County, Arkansas

References

External links

Road bridges on the National Register of Historic Places in Arkansas
Bridges completed in 1928
Historic American Engineering Record in Arkansas
National Register of Historic Places in Garland County, Arkansas
Concrete bridges in the United States
Arch bridges in the United States
Transportation in Garland County, Arkansas
1928 establishments in Arkansas
Ouachita River